Southern Burun is a Western Nilotic language of Sudan. It is a dialect continuum with Burun proper (Northern Burun), Mabaan/Ulu, and Jumjum (Arabic: جومجوم(?)).

Phonology 
These are from the Jumjum dialect.

Vowels 
Burun has 8 vowels. All vowels have long equivalents.

Consonants 
Burun has 20 consonants.

References

Luo languages